For Her People is a 1914 British silent drama film directed by Laurence Trimble and starring Florence Turner, Rex Davis and Franklyn Bellamy.

Cast
 Florence Turner as Joan 
 Clifford Pembroke as Leslie Calder 
 Rex Davis as Tom 
 Franklyn Bellamy as Henry Calder 
 Herbert Dunsey as William Arnold 
 John MacAndrews as Greengrocer

References

Bibliography
 Low, Rachael. The History of the British Film 1914-1918. Routledge, 2005.

External links
 

1914 films
1914 drama films
British silent feature films
British drama films
Films directed by Laurence Trimble
British black-and-white films
1910s English-language films
1910s British films
Silent drama films